İsmail Özgür Göktaş (born 23 April 1989) is a Turkish footballer who plays for Tarsus Idman Yurdu. He is one of the young players of Bursaspor whom coach Samet Aybaba trusted and gave the opportunity to play 2007–2008 season. He's regarded as a promising right winger. Göktaş loan in Kasımpaşa.

References

1989 births
Living people
Turkish footballers
Bursaspor footballers
Süper Lig players
Turkey youth international footballers

Association football midfielders